The District of Setúbal is a district located in the south-west of Portugal. It is named for its capital, the city of Setúbal.

Geography 
It is delimited by Lisbon District and Santarém District on the north, Évora District on the east, Beja District on the south and the Atlantic Ocean on the west. It was split off from Lisbon District in 1926, and is the only Portuguese district created after 1835.

Municipalities 
It is composed of 13 municipalities, spread over two sub regions:

 Península de Setúbal Subregion NUTS II Sub-Region:
 Alcochete
 Almada
 Barreiro 
 Moita 
 Montijo 
 Palmela 
 Seixal 
 Sesimbra
 Setúbal
 Alentejo Litoral Subregion:
 Alcácer do Sal
 Grândola
 Santiago do Cacém
 Sines

List of Parliamentary Representatives

Summary of votes and seats won 1976-2022

|- class="unsortable"
!rowspan=2|Parties!!%!!S!!%!!S!!%!!S!!%!!S!!%!!S!!%!!S!!%!!S!!%!!S!!%!!S!!%!!S!!%!!S!!%!!S!!%!!S!!%!!S!!%!!S!!%!!S
|- class="unsortable" align="center"
!colspan=2 | 1976
!colspan=2 | 1979
!colspan=2 | 1980
!colspan=2 | 1983
!colspan=2 | 1985
!colspan=2 | 1987
!colspan=2 | 1991
!colspan=2 | 1995
!colspan=2 | 1999
!colspan=2 | 2002
!colspan=2 | 2005
!colspan=2 | 2009
!colspan=2 | 2011
!colspan=2 | 2015
!colspan=2 | 2019
!colspan=2 | 2022
|-
| align="left"| PS || 32.2 || 7 || 21.4 || 4 ||23.5 || 4 || 30.6 || 6 || 16.5 || 3 || 17.6 || 3 || 28.4 || 5 || style="background:#FF66FF;"|44.9 || style="background:#FF66FF;"|9  || style="background:#FF66FF;"|43.7 || style="background:#FF66FF;"|8 || style="background:#FF66FF;"|39.3 || style="background:#FF66FF;"|7 || style="background:#FF66FF;"|43.6 || style="background:#FF66FF;"|8 || style="background:#FF66FF;"|34.0 || style="background:#FF66FF;"|7 || style="background:#FF66FF;"|26.9 || style="background:#FF66FF;"|5 || style="background:#FF66FF;"|34.3 || style="background:#FF66FF;"|7 || style="background:#FF66FF;"|38.6 || style="background:#FF66FF;"|9 || style="background:#FF66FF;"|45.7 || style="background:#FF66FF;"|10
|-
| align="left"| PSD || 8.4 || 1 || align=center colspan=4 rowspan=2|In AD || 12.7 || 2 || 15.4 || 3 || 32.6 || 6 || style="background:#FF9900;"|34.7 || style="background:#FF9900;"|6 || 18.4 || 3 || 18.0 || 3 || 24.7 || 5 || 16.1 || 3 || 16.4 || 3 || 25.2 || 5 || align=center colspan=2 rowspan=2|In PàF || 14.4 || 3 || 16.2 || 3
|-
| align="left"| CDS-PP || 4.4 ||  || 5.1 || 1 || 3.8 ||  || 1.9 ||  || 2.7 ||  || 7.2 || 1 || 5.6 || 1 || 6.9 || 1 || 5.1 || 1 || 9.1 || 1 || 12.1 || 2 || 3.0 ||  || 1.1 || 
|-
| align="left"| PCP/APU/CDU || style="background:red;"|44.4 || style="background:red;"|9 || style="background:red;"|47.0 || style="background:red;"|9 || style="background:red;"|44.0 || style="background:red;"|9 || style="background:red;"|45.8 || style="background:red;"|8 || style="background:red;"|38.2 || style="background:red;"|7 || style="background:red;"|32.7 || style="background:red;"|7 || 24.9 || 5 || 24.8 || 4 || 24.8 || 5 || 20.5 || 4 || 20.0 || 3 || 20.1 || 4 || 19.6 || 4 || 18.8 || 4 || 15.8 || 3 || 10.1 || 2
|-
| align="left"| AD || colspan=2| || 22.3 || 4 || 24.1 || 4 || colspan=26|
|-
| align="left"| PRD || colspan=8| || 20.4 || 4 || 8.7 || 1 || colspan=20|
|-
| align="left"| BE || colspan=16| || 3.5 ||  || 4.6 ||  || 10.3 || 2 || 14.0 || 2 || 7.1 || 1 || 13.1 || 2 || 12.1 || 2 || 5.8 || 1
|-
| align="left"| PàF || colspan=26| || 22.6 || 5 || colspan=4|
|-
| align="left"| PAN || colspan=28| || 4.4 || 1 || 2.0 || 
|-
| align="left"| CHEGA || colspan=28| || 1.9 ||  || 9.0 || 1
|-
| align="left"| IL || colspan=28| || 1.1 ||  || 5.1 || 1
|-
! Total seats || colspan=12|17 || colspan=2|16 || colspan=12|17 || colspan=6|18
|-
! colspan=33|Source: Comissão Nacional de Eleições
|}

References

External links
Setubal District Map
Setubal info
 Portugal Dream Coast
 Local News O Bocagiano 

 
Districts of Portugal
District
Districts in Lisboa Region